This list of natural disasters in New Zealand documents notable natural disasters and epidemics that have occurred in New Zealand since 1843. Of these natural disasters, the 1918 flu pandemic resulted in the highest loss of life with 8,600 deaths in New Zealand.

Notable natural disasters

See also
List of disasters in New Zealand by death toll
List of natural disasters in Australia

Notes

References

Natural disasters
Natural disasters in New Zealand
Natural disasters